The 2009 SMU Mustangs football team represented Southern Methodist University in the 2009 NCAA Division I FBS football season. The Mustangs, led by second-year head coach June Jones, played their home games at Gerald J. Ford Stadium and competed in Conference USA.

The 2009 Mustangs played in a bowl game for the first time since the program's 1989 emergence from its 1987 shutdown due to massive NCAA rule violations. SMU was invited to the Hawaii Bowl, where they played Nevada. The Mustangs won, 45–10, to finish the season 8–5.

Previous season
The 2008 team finished with an overall record of 1–11 with a conference record of 0–8, finishing in last place in the Conference USA West Division. The team's lone win was a 47–36 victory over FCS Texas State.

Schedule

Roster

Game summaries

Stephen F. Austin

at UAB

at Washington State

at No. 11 TCU

East Carolina

Navy

at No. 17 Houston

at Tulsa

Rice

UTEP

at Marshall

Tulane

vs. Nevada (Hawaii Bowl)

Team players drafted into the NFL

References

SMU
SMU Mustangs football seasons
Hawaii Bowl champion seasons
SMU Mustangs football